Island Lake is a small community in northeast Manitoba, Canada. The community consists of an archipelago near the north shore of Island Lake which includes the following islands: Stevenson, Wass, Hamilton, Boothe, Chapins, RC Mission, Gravel, and Lindsays.

Other nearby communities on the lake are Garden Hill, St. Theresa Point, and Wasagamack. The community is served by the Island Lake Airport.

The community of Island Lake consists of several government and private agencies such as a Royal Canadian Mounted Police detachment, a Manitoba Conservation office, Government of Manitoba (who operates the airport), Stevenson Island School (Frontier School Division), Bell MTS, Manitoba Hydro office, the North West Company, which operates the Northern Store, several small convenience stores and Island Lake Lodge, a fly fishing lodge on Stevenson Island.

Perimeter Aviation has daily service to Island Lake from Winnipeg James Armstrong Richardson International Airport using Bombardier Dash 8 and Fairchild Swearingen Metroliners. They also have a Medevac Base on Stevenson Island serving the community 365 days a year.

Climate 
With 21.11 hours of fog annually, Island Lake is one of the least foggy places in Canada. Only Penticton, British Columbia, gets less fog during the year, and no one gets less fog in February when Island Lake averages a mere 0.67 hours.

Island Lake has a subarctic climate (Dfc) with mild, rainy summers and severely cold winters.

Demographics 

Gallery

References 

 
Designated places in Manitoba
Hudson's Bay Company trading posts
Northern communities in Manitoba